Coleophora zygodon is a moth of the family Coleophoridae. It is found in Russia.

References

zygodon
Moths of Asia
Moths described in 1993